Northcote is a suburb of Auckland in northern New Zealand. It is situated on the North Shore, on the northern shores of Waitematā Harbour, four km northwest of Auckland CBD. The suburb includes the peninsula of Northcote Point and the northern approaches to the Auckland Harbour Bridge. Northcote Central is to the north of Northcote.

History

Northcote Point, known as Tōtaratahi ("single Totara tree"), was the location of Te Onewa Pā, a fortified pā supporting Tāmaki Māori in the area, close to kūmara gardens, shellfish and the Waitemata Harbour shark fishery, which were hunted for during summers. The land was purchased by the crown during the Mahurangi purchase in 1840, after which the peninsula was named Rough Point, named after Captain David Rough, first harbourmaster of Auckland. In 1848 it was renamed Stokes Point, in honour of Captain John Lort Stokes of the survey vessel HMS Acheron. In 1880, it was renamed Northcote Point, and in 1908 the peninsula became a public park.

In 1882, the St Heliers and Northcote Land Company was formed and some land in the area was subdivided. In 1889 a major subdivision was the result when the Bartley Estate was auctioned. Before the construction of the Harbour Bridge, the Northcote Wharf was heavily utilised by Auckland Harbour ferry services. After the bridge was opened in 1959, the number of ferry crossings fell and the Northcote Point peninsula became a quiet cul-de-sac. The wooden Northcote Tavern was once in the thick of things; it still stands but now surveys a quiet streetscape.

Demographics

Northcote had a population of 5,742 at the 2018 New Zealand census, an increase of 393 people (7.3%) since the 2013 census, and an increase of 513 people (9.8%) since the 2006 census. There were 1,959 households, comprising 2,751 males and 2,991 females, giving a sex ratio of 0.92 males per female, with 1,041 people (18.1%) aged under 15 years, 1,185 (20.6%) aged 15 to 29, 2,718 (47.3%) aged 30 to 64, and 792 (13.8%) aged 65 or older.

Ethnicities were 73.6% European/Pākehā, 7.7% Māori, 3.7% Pacific peoples, 21.9% Asian, and 2.7% other ethnicities. People may identify with more than one ethnicity.

The percentage of people born overseas was 36.1, compared with 27.1% nationally.

Although some people chose not to answer the census's question about religious affiliation, 53.1% had no religion, 34.7% were Christian, 0.2% had Māori religious beliefs, 2.0% were Hindu, 1.3% were Muslim, 1.4% were Buddhist and 2.4% had other religions.

Of those at least 15 years old, 1,941 (41.3%) people had a bachelor's or higher degree, and 354 (7.5%) people had no formal qualifications. 1,458 people (31.0%) earned over $70,000 compared to 17.2% nationally. The employment status of those at least 15 was that 2,583 (54.9%) people were employed full-time, 717 (15.3%) were part-time, and 138 (2.9%) were unemployed.

Local government

From 1876 until 1908, Northcote was a part of the Takapuna Riding administered by the Waitemata County, a large rural county north and west of the city of Auckland. In 1908, the area split from the county, forming the Northcote Borough Council. In 1989, the borough was merged into the North Shore City. North Shore City Council was amalgamated into Auckland Council in November 2010.

Within the Auckland Council, Northcote is a part of the Kaipātiki local government area governed by the Kaipātiki Local Board. It is a part of the North Shore ward, which elects two councillors to the Auckland Council.

Mayors of Northcote Borough Council

1908 Alexander Bruce
1908–1912 Herbert Cadness
1912–1917 George Fraser
1917–1919 John Byrne Tonar
1919–1921 Arthur Edwin Greenslade
1921–1925 William Ernest Richardson
1925–1927 Charles Archibald Deuxberry 
1927–1931 Arthur Edwin Greenslade
1931–1941 Robert Martin
1941–1944 Ernest Clyde Fowler 
1944–1956 Frank Montagne Pearn
1956–1962 John Forsyth Potter 
1962–1968 Albert Ernest James Holdaway
1968–1974 Alfred James Evans
1974–1979 Trevor Edwin La Roche
1979–1989 Jean Sampson

Features and landmarks
Northcote is surrounded by the suburbs of Birkenhead, Hillcrest and Takapuna to the west and north, and the waters of Shoal Bay, an arm of the Waitemata, to the south and east. State Highway 1 stretches along the waterfront of Shoal Bay, heading north from the bridge towards Albany.

To the north of Northcote Point on one of the main routes leading to and from the Harbour Bridge is the Northcote Shopping Centre, which was developed in the early 1960s. It is now a multi-cultural retail hub featuring many Asian food outlets.

Smiths Bush in the Onewa Domain is a remnant native forest, dominated by kahikatea and taraire trees. Originally purchased by Alexander Mackay, his son-in-law Thomas Drummond preserved the forest from milling. The park became a public reserve in 1942, and received its name from James and Catherine Smith, the owners of the land who preserved it in the early 20th century. A large section of the forest was felled in 1959, during the construction of the Auckland Northern Motorway.

Notable buildings 

 St John the Baptist (Anglican Church)

Education
It was established in 1877.

During its early years, the College incorporated Standards five and six (Forms one and two) which were transferred to Northcote Intermediate School when that was established as a separate entity on its present site in Lake Road in Northcote Central in 1958.

It was established on its present site in 1918. The Northcote area war memorial stands at the front of the school, on the corner of Lake and Onewa Roads.

It is a state integrated Catholic school, which provides education for both boys and girls in years 1–6, and for girls only in years 7–8. It celebrated its 75th Jubilee in 2008.

Rolls are as of

Sport and recreation
Northcote is home to the Northcote Tigers rugby league club and the Northcote Birkenhead Rugby Union Sports Club.

Transport
Auckland ferry services run by Fullers Group stop at Northcote Point, near the northern end of the Auckland Harbour Bridge.

References

Further reading
Hodgson, Terence (1992). The Heart of Colonial Auckland, 1865–1910. Random Century NZ.

External links
 Photographs of Northcote held in Auckland Libraries' heritage collections.
 Photographs of Northcote Point held in Auckland Libraries' heritage collections.

Kaipātiki Local Board Area
Suburbs of Auckland
North Shore, New Zealand
Populated places around the Waitematā Harbour